The following outline is provided as an overview of and topical guide to the British Virgin Islands:

British Virgin Islands (BVI) – British overseas territory located in the eastern portion of the Virgin Islands Archipelago in the Caribbean Sea.  The Virgin Islands are part of the Leeward Islands of the Lesser Antilles.  The United States Virgin Islands comprises the western portion of the archipelago.  Technically the name of the Territory is simply the "Virgin Islands", but in practice since 1917 they have been almost universally referred to as the "British Virgin Islands" to distinguish the islands from the American Territory. To add to the regional confusion, the Puerto Rican islands of Culebra, Vieques and surrounding islands began referring to themselves as the "Spanish Virgin Islands" as part of a tourism drive in the early 2000s.

The British Virgin Islands consist of the main islands of Tortola, Virgin Gorda, Anegada and Jost Van Dyke, along with over fifty other smaller islands and cays. Approximately fifteen of the islands are inhabited. The largest island, Tortola, is approximately 20 km (approx. 12 mi) long and 5 km (approx. 3 mi) wide. The islands have a total population of about 22,000, of whom approximately 18,000 live on Tortola. Road Town, the capital, is situated on Tortola.

General reference 

 Pronunciation:
 Common English country name:  The British Virgin Islands
 Official English country name:  Virgin Islands
 Common endonym(s):  
 Official endonym(s):  
 Adjectival(s): Virgin Island
 Demonym(s):
 ISO country codes: VG, VGB, 092
 ISO region codes: See ISO 3166-2:VG
 Internet country code top-level domain: .vg

Geography of the British Virgin Islands 

Geography of the British Virgin Islands
 The British Virgin Islands are: a British overseas territory
 Location:
 Northern Hemisphere and Western Hemisphere
 North America (though not on the mainland)
 Atlantic Ocean
 North Atlantic
 Caribbean, east of Puerto Rico
 Antilles
 Lesser Antilles
 Leeward Islands
 Virgin Islands archipelago
 Time zone:  Eastern Caribbean Time (UTC-04)
 Extreme points of the British Virgin Islands
 High:  Mount Sage 
 Low:  Caribbean Sea 0 m
 Land boundaries:  none
 Coastline:  80 km
 Population of the British Virgin Islands: 2005 census: 22,016

 Area of the British Virgin Islands: 153 km²
 Atlas of the British Virgin Islands

Environment of the British Virgin Islands 

 Climate of the British Virgin Islands
 Renewable energy in the British Virgin Islands
 Geology of the British Virgin Islands
 Protected areas of the British Virgin Islands
 Biosphere reserves in the British Virgin Islands
 National parks of the British Virgin Islands
 Wildlife of the British Virgin Islands
 Fauna of the British Virgin Islands
 Birds of the British Virgin Islands
 Mammals of the British Virgin Islands

Natural geographic features of the British Virgin Islands 

 Fjords of the British Virgin Islands
 Glaciers of the British Virgin Islands
 Islands of the British Virgin Islands
 Lakes of the British Virgin Islands
 Mountains of the British Virgin Islands
 Volcanoes in the British Virgin Islands
 Rivers of the British Virgin Islands
 Waterfalls of the British Virgin Islands
 Valleys of the British Virgin Islands
 World Heritage Sites in the British Virgin Islands: None

Regions of the British Virgin Islands 

Regions of the British Virgin Islands

Ecoregions of the British Virgin Islands 

List of ecoregions in the British Virgin Islands

Administrative divisions of the British Virgin Islands 

Administrative divisions of the British Virgin Islands
 Provinces of the British Virgin Islands
 Districts of the British Virgin Islands
 Municipalities of the British Virgin Islands

Provinces of the British Virgin Islands 

Provinces of the British Virgin Islands

Districts of the British Virgin Islands 

Districts of the British Virgin Islands

Municipalities of the British Virgin Islands 

Municipalities of the British Virgin Islands
 Capital of the British Virgin Islands: Road Town
 Cities of the British Virgin Islands

Demography of the British Virgin Islands 

Demographics of the British Virgin Islands

Government and politics of the British Virgin Islands 

Politics of the British Virgin Islands
 Form of government: parliamentary representative democratic dependency
 Capital of the British Virgin Islands: Road Town
 Elections in the British Virgin Islands
 Political parties in the British Virgin Islands
 Taxation in the British Virgin Islands

Branches of the government of the British Virgin Islands 

Government of the British Virgin Islands

Executive branch of the government of the British Virgin Islands 
 Head of state: Monarch of the United Kingdom, King Charles III
 Monarch's representative: Governor of the British Virgin Islands, John Rankin
 Head of government: Premier of the British Virgin Islands, Natalio Wheatley
 Heads of government of the British Virgin Islands
 Cabinet: Cabinet of the British Virgin Islands

Legislative branch of the government of the British Virgin Islands 

 House of Assembly of the British Virgin Islands (unicameral)

Judicial branch of the government of the British Virgin Islands 

Court system of the British Virgin Islands
 Eastern Caribbean Supreme Court
 High Court of Justice of the British Virgin Islands
 Court of Appeal of the British Virgin Islands
 Magistrate's Court of the British Virgin Islands
 Juvenile Court of the British Virgin Islands
 Court of Summary Jurisdiction of the British Virgin Islands

Foreign relations of the British Virgin Islands 

Foreign relations of the British Virgin Islands
 Diplomatic missions in the British Virgin Islands
 Diplomatic missions of the British Virgin Islands

International organization membership 
The government of the British Virgin Islands is a member of:
Caribbean Community and Common Market (Caricom) (associate)
Caribbean Development Bank (CDB)
International Criminal Police Organization (Interpol) (subbureau)
International Olympic Committee (IOC)
Organization of Eastern Caribbean States (OECS)
United Nations Educational, Scientific, and Cultural Organization (UNESCO) (associate)
Universal Postal Union (UPU)
World Federation of Trade Unions (WFTU)

Law and order in the British Virgin Islands 

Law of the British Virgin Islands
 Constitution of the British Virgin Islands
 Crime in the British Virgin Islands
 Human rights in the British Virgin Islands
 LGBT rights in the British Virgin Islands
 Freedom of religion in the British Virgin Islands
 Law enforcement in the British Virgin Islands

Military of the British Virgin Islands 

Military of the British Virgin Islands
 Command
 Commander-in-chief:
 Ministry of Defence of the British Virgin Islands
 Forces
 Army of the British Virgin Islands
 Navy of the British Virgin Islands
 Air Force of the British Virgin Islands
 Special forces of the British Virgin Islands
 Military history of the British Virgin Islands
 Military ranks of the British Virgin Islands

Local government in the British Virgin Islands 

Local government in the British Virgin Islands

History of the British Virgin Islands 

History of the British Virgin Islands
 Timeline of the history of the British Virgin Islands
 Current events of the British Virgin Islands
 Military history of the British Virgin Islands

Culture of the British Virgin Islands 

Culture of the British Virgin Islands
 Architecture of the British Virgin Islands
 Cuisine of the British Virgin Islands
 Festivals in the British Virgin Islands
 Languages of the British Virgin Islands
 Media in the British Virgin Islands
 National symbols of the British Virgin Islands
 Coat of arms of the British Virgin Islands
 Flag of the British Virgin Islands
 National anthem of the British Virgin Islands
 People of the British Virgin Islands
 Public holidays in the British Virgin Islands
 Records of the British Virgin Islands
 Religion in the British Virgin Islands
 Christianity in the British Virgin Islands
 Hinduism in the British Virgin Islands
 Islam in the British Virgin Islands
 Judaism in the British Virgin Islands
 Sikhism in the British Virgin Islands
 World Heritage Sites in the British Virgin Islands: None

Art in the British Virgin Islands 
 Art in the British Virgin Islands
 Cinema of the British Virgin Islands
 Literature of the British Virgin Islands

Literature

Among the noted names in Virgin Islands literature are Alphaeus Osario Norman (1885-1942), Verna Penn Moll, Jennie Wheatley, and Patricia G. Turnbull. Their poetry and that of 22 other writers, including the fastly emerging poet and literary critic Richard Georges, can be found in Where I See the Sun – Contemporary Poetry in The Virgin Islands (Tortola, Virgin Gorda, Anegada, Jost Van Dyke), an anthology edited by Lasana M. Sekou in 2016.

 Music of the British Virgin Islands
 Television in the British Virgin Islands
 Theatre in the British Virgin Islands

Sports in the British Virgin Islands 

Sports in the British Virgin Islands
 Football in the British Virgin Islands
 British Virgin Islands at the Olympics
 British Virgin Islands at the 2006 Commonwealth Games

Economy and infrastructure of the British Virgin Islands 

Economy of the British Virgin Islands
 Economic rank, by nominal GDP (2007): 170th (one hundred and seventieth)
 Agriculture in the British Virgin Islands
 Banking in the British Virgin Islands
 National Bank of the British Virgin Islands
 Communications in the British Virgin Islands
 Internet in the British Virgin Islands
 Companies of the British Virgin Islands
Currency of the British Virgin Islands: Dollar
ISO 4217: USD
 Energy in the British Virgin Islands
 Energy policy of the British Virgin Islands
 Oil industry in the British Virgin Islands
 Mining in the British Virgin Islands
 British Virgin Islands Stock Exchange
 Tourism in the British Virgin Islands
 Transport in the British Virgin Islands
 Airports in the British Virgin Islands

Education in the British Virgin Islands 

Education in the British Virgin Islands

See also 

British Virgin Islands
Index of British Virgin Islands-related articles
List of British Virgin Islands-related topics
List of international rankings
Outline of geography
Outline of North America
Outline of the Caribbean
Outline of the United Kingdom

References

External links

 Official sites and overviews
 The Government of the British Virgin Islands (official government site)
 The Government of the BVI, London Office – Official government site
 British Virgin Islands: Nature's Little Secrets – Official site of the British Virgin Islands Tourist Board
 The British Virgin Islands Ports Authority – Official site
 National Parks Trust of the British Virgin Islands – Official site
 British Virgin Islands Financial Services Commission – Official site
British Virgin Islands. The World Factbook. Central Intelligence Agency.

 Directories

.
British Virgin Islands